The Coorparoo Ward is a Brisbane City Council ward covering Coorparoo, Carina Heights, Greenslopes and parts of East Brisbane, Annerley and Camp Hill.

Parts of East Brisbane were added in boundary changes prior to the 2020 LGA elections.

Councillors for Coorparoo Ward

Results

References

City of Brisbane wards